The New York City Teachers Guild (1935-1960), AKA "Local 2, AFT" as of June 1941, was a progressive labor union that started as breakaway from the New York City Teachers Union and later merged into the United Federation of Teachers.

History

1930s
The New York City Teachers Union (TU) had experience conflict internally for more of the early 1930s.  The opposing groups were the founders (Henry Linville and Abraham Lefkowitz–at the time called "administrators") and "Rank and File" members (many of whom were also Communist Party members).

During an August 1935 national convention, the American Federation of Teachers (AFT) voted down a TU administrators' request to reorganize (100 to 79). On October 1, 1935, Linville and Lefkowitz led all officers, nearly all executive board members, and nearly 800 members (including Communist Lovestoneite members of a rival "Progressive Group") out of the TU to form the Teachers Guild (TG).

1940s

On March 29, 1940, the New York State Legislature formed the "Rapp-Coudert Committee" to investigate finances (Rapp in the New York State Assembly) and subversive activities (Coudert in the New York State Senate).  From September 1940 through December 1941, Coudert investigated more than 500 people regarding their affiliation with the Communist Party USA.  Coudert's subcommittee focused on the TU Local 5 as well as a college professors union Local 537.  Former TU leaders who had helped found the TG, Henry Linville and Benjamin Mandel, testified against TU members. On June 20, 1941, the AFT designated the TG as "Local 2, AFT."  On December 29, 1940, the AFT voted and in May 1941 officially expelled three communist-influenced locals:  the TU (Local 5, AFT), the New York College Teachers Union (Local 537, AFT), and the Philadelphia Teachers Union (Local 192, AFT).  In June 1941, the AFT made the TG its "Local 5, AFT" in New York City.  In 1943, the Rapp-Coudert Committee endorsed school financing policies of the TG.

1950s

(Forthcoming)

1960

In March 1960, the TG and Committee of Action Through Unity (CATU) merged into the United Federation of Teachers (Local 2, AFT).  In August 1960, New York's Board of Education and the UFT conducted initial collective bargaining.

People

The TU was a client of Harold I. Cammer.

Presidents

All TG presidents were former members of the TU:
 Henry Linville
 Albert Smallheiser
 Rebecca Simonson
 Charles Cogen

Leaders

 Ben Davidson (politician)
 Layle Lane
 David Selden

Assessment

In 2015, Nicholas Toloudis attributed the demise of the TU not only to Red Scares in the 1940s and 1950s but also to competition with other city teachers associations. In particular, the TG was "accommodating to the government, while the radical Union was confrontational" and "consistently sacrificed its commitment to academic freedom by collaborating with public authorities" to reveal TU ties to the CPUSA.

See also

 Teachers Union
 United Federation of Teachers
 American Federation of Teachers
 Rapp-Coudert Committee

References

External sources

 
 
 
 
 
 
 
 
 
 
 
 

Trade unions in New York (state)
Trade unions established in 1935
Trade unions disestablished in 1960
1935 establishments in New York City